Scheila (minor planet designation: 596 Scheila) is a main-belt asteroid and main-belt comet
orbiting the Sun. It was discovered on 21 February 1906 by August Kopff from Heidelberg. Kopff named the asteroid after a female English student with whom he was acquainted.

Overview

On 11 December 2010, Steve Larson of the Catalina Sky Survey detected a comet-like appearance to asteroid Scheila: it displayed a "coma" of about magnitude 13.5. Inspection of archival Catalina Sky Survey observations showed the activity was triggered between 11 November 2010 and 3 December. Imaging with the 2-meter Faulkes Telescope North revealed a linear tail in the anti-sunward direction and an orbital tail, indicative of larger slower particles.

When first detected it was unknown what drove the ejecta plumes. Scheila's gravity is too large for electrostatics to launch dust. Cometary outgassing could not be ruled out until detailed spectroscopic observations indicated the absence of gas in Scheila's plumes. Observations by the Hubble Space Telescope and the Neil Gehrels Swift Observatory's ultraviolet-optical telescope make it most likely that Scheila was impacted at ~5 km/s by a previously unknown asteroid ~35 meters in diameter. Each asteroid the size of Scheila might be hit by an impactor 10–100 meters in diameter approximately every 1000 years, so with 200 asteroids of this size or bigger in the asteroid belt, we can observe a collision as often as every 5 years.

As a consequence of the 2010 impact, the surface spectrum of Scheila changed, from a moderately red T-type spectrum to a more reddish D-type spectrum, showing how "fresh" material weathers over time in space. This is similar to laboratory experiments done on the Tagish Lake meteorite.

Scheila last came to perihelion on 2012 May 19.

See also 
 354P/LINEAR
 493 Griseldis – another main-belt asteroid collision in 2015
 P/2016 G1 (PanSTARRS)

References

External links 
 Comet-like appearance of (596) Scheila (Remanzacco Observatory)
 What's up with Scheila (596) (AARTScope Blog)
 Joseph Brimacombe animation on flickr
 (596) Scheila 2010-12-12 10:45:39UT (cbellh47 @ flickr)
 (596) Scheila by Rolando Ligustri (CAST-Italia)
 Comet-like appearance of (596) Scheila (MPML at Yahoo Groups)
 Asteroid 596 Scheila "Outburst" (Unmanned SpaceFlight)
 asteroid 596 Scheila goes cometary! (Cloudy Nights)
  (University of Arizona 2010 Dec 21)
NASA's Swift and Hubble Probe Asteroid Collision Debris (04.28.11)
 
 
 The cause of asteroid Scheila’s outburst (EPSC-DPS JOINT MEETING 2011 PRESS NOTICE)
 Lightcurve plot of 596 Scheila, Palmer Divide Observatory, B. D. Warner (2005)
 
 

000596
000596
Discoveries by August Kopff
Named minor planets
Small-asteroids collision
000596
000596
19060221